Zoshchenko,  is a Russian and Ukrainian surname. Notable people with the surname include:

 Mikhail Zoshchenko (1894–1958), Soviet author and satirist
 5759 Zoshchenko, named after Mikhail

Russian-language surnames
Ukrainian-language surnames